Biskupice is a municipality and village in Svitavy District in the Pardubice Region of the Czech Republic. It has about 500 inhabitants.

Administrative parts
The village of Zálesí is an administrative part of Biskupice.

Notable people
Princess Eulalia of Thurn and Taxis (1908–1993), princess

References

Villages in Svitavy District